Frances Wood  (née Chick; 25 December 1883 – 12 October 1919) was an English chemist and statistician after whom the Wood medal of the Royal Statistical Society is named.

Life
Wood grew up in a large family, the daughter of lace dealer Samuel Chick and the sister of nutritionist Harriette Chick. She studied at Notting Hill High School from 1897 to 1903; she then read chemistry at University College London from 1904 to 1908, earning second class honours there.

From 1908 to 1912 she worked at the Lister Institute of Preventive Medicine as a research chemist, but during this period shifted her interests to medical statistics. She became Grocers’ Research Scholar at Lister in 1912, was seconded to the Board of Trade for the war in 1914, and later moved to the Ministry of Munitions. She remained there until March 1919, when she resigned because of her pregnancy.

She married Sydney Wood, an inspector of the Board of Education, in July 1911. Her daughter Barbara was born in September 1919 by Caesarian section, but Frances died two weeks later of sepsis.

Contributions
Wood's early works in chemistry involved polymerisation and fermentation, under Sir William Ramsay and then Arthur Harden. As a medical statistician, she compared food prices with wages and rent, the generalisation of statistical correlations on death rates, and mortality rates for cancer and diabetes.

Her work during the war remains unpublished, but two posthumous papers concern the effects of higher education on fertility, and the correlation between economic class and child mental development.

Her sole-author paper on trends in wages in London 1900–1912 was read before a meeting of the Royal Statistical Society on 18 November 1913, which RSS president F. Y. Edgeworth commented made "an important contribution to the art of measuring changes in the value of money". She published one further article in the RSS journals, on the changes in the price of food experienced by the working and upper classes, in 1915, with no author affiliation.

Awards and honours
Wood became a fellow of the Royal Statistical Society in 1913.
She became a member of the Order of the British Empire in 1917, and an officer in the order in 1918.
Shortly after her death, the society raised funds for a biennial essay contest in her memory. The first recipient of the Frances Wood Memorial Prize was Winifred Mackenzie for her article, "Changes in the Standard of Living in the United Kingdom, 1860-1914." In 2017, the society instituted their Wood medal "for excellent contributions to economic or social statistics".

Selected publications

References

External links

1883 births
1919 deaths
English chemists
English statisticians
English women chemists
Women statisticians
People educated at Notting Hill & Ealing High School
Fellows of the Royal Statistical Society
Officers of the Order of the British Empire